UGG may refer to:

UGG (brand), a brand of footwear, bags, clothing and other goods
Ugg boots, a style of sheepskin boot that originated in Australia and New Zealand
Deckers Outdoor Corporation, trading as UGG Australia
United Grain Growers, a Canadian grain distributor that merged with Agricore in 2001
Tryptophan, an essential amino acid in the human diet (mRNA genetic code)
Untitled Goose Game, a multi-platform puzzle stealth video game developed by House House and published by Panic in 2019.